Montezuma Castle National Monument protects a set of well-preserved dwellings located in Camp Verde, Arizona, which were built and used by the Sinagua people, a pre-Columbian culture closely related to the Hohokam and other indigenous peoples of the southwestern United States, between approximately AD 1100 and 1425. The main structure comprises five stories and about 20 rooms and was built over the course of three centuries.

Several Hopi clans and Yavapai communities trace their ancestries to early immigrants from the Montezuma Castle/Beaver Creek area. Archaeological evidence proves that the Hohokam and Hakataya settled around or in the Verde Valley. Clan members periodically return to these ancestral homes for religious ceremonies.

Etymology

Neither part of the monument's name is correct. When European-Americans first observed the ruins in the 1860s, by then long-abandoned, they named them for the famous Aztec emperor Montezuma in the mistaken belief that he had been connected to their construction (see also Montezuma mythology). Having no connections to the Aztecs, the Montezuma Castle was given that name due to the fact that the public had this image of the Aztecs creating any archaeological site. In fact, the dwelling was abandoned more than 40 years before Montezuma was born, and was not a "castle" in the traditional sense, but instead functioned more like a "prehistoric high rise apartment complex".

Cliff dwelling
Montezuma Castle is situated about  up a sheer limestone cliff, facing the adjacent Beaver Creek, which drains into the perennial Verde River just north of Camp Verde. It is one of the best-preserved cliff dwellings in North America, in part because of its ideal placement in a natural alcove that protects it from exposure to the elements. The precariousness of the dwelling's location and its immense scale of floor space across five stories suggest that the Sinagua were daring builders and skilled engineers. Access into the structure was most likely permitted by a series of portable ladders, which made it difficult for enemy tribes to penetrate the natural defense of the vertical barrier.

Perhaps the main reason the Sinagua chose to build the Castle so far above the ground, however, was to escape the threat of natural disaster in the form of the annual flooding of Beaver Creek. During the summer monsoon season, the creek frequently breached its banks, inundating the floodplain with water. The Sinagua recognized the importance of these floods to their agriculture, but likely also the potential destruction they presented to any structures built in the floodplain. Their solution was to build a permanent structure in the high recess afforded by the limestone cliff.

The walls of Montezuma Castle are examples of early stone-and-mortar masonry, constructed almost entirely from chunks of limestone found at the base of the cliff, as well as mud and/or clay from the creek bottom. The ceilings of the rooms also incorporated sectioned timbers as a kind of roof thatching, obtained primarily from the Arizona sycamore, a large hardwood tree native to the Verde Valley.

History
Evidence of permanent dwellings like those at Montezuma Castle begins to appear in the archaeological record of Arizona's Verde Valley about 1050 AD. The first distinctly Sinagua culture may have occupied the region as early as 700 AD. 

Although the short-term impact may have been destructive, nutrient-rich sediment deposited by the volcano may have aided more expansive agriculture in later decades. During the interim, the Sinagua lived in the surrounding highlands and sustained themselves on small-scale agriculture dependent on rain. After 1125, the Sinagua resettled the Verde Valley, using the reliable watershed of the Verde River alongside irrigation systems left by previous inhabitants, perhaps including Hohokam peoples, to support more widespread farming.

The region's population likely peaked around 1300 AD, with the Castle housing between 30 and 50 people in at least 20 rooms. Radiocarbon dates from multiple construction beams show that the cliff dwelling was probably constructed in the middle 1100s AD with remodeling and additions in the last decades of the 1200s. A neighboring segment of the same cliff wall suggests there was an even larger dwelling ("Castle A") around the same time, of which only the stone foundations have survived. Its discovery in 1933 revealed many Sinagua artifacts and greatly increased understanding of their way of life.

The latest estimated date of occupation for any Sinagua site comes from Montezuma Castle, around 1425 AD. After this, the Sinagua people apparently abandoned their permanent settlements and migrated elsewhere, as did other cultural groups in the southwestern United States around that time. The reasons for abandonment are unclear, but possibilities include drought, resource depletion, and clashes with the newly arrived Yavapai people. Due to the very little human contact since abandonment, Montezuma Castle was well preserved. It was heavily looted in the late 19th and early 20th centuries, though other Sinagua sites have remained more or less intact. Because of the rise in settlers, tourists and industries in or surrounding Montezuma Castle, the monument and even Verde Valley have been threats to the preservation of Montezuma Castle.

Plants and animals
Due to the lack of basic knowledge on the natural resources of the national parks, the National Park Service created a program in order to record and identify any changes in the environment and its inhabitants. An inventory of plants and animals at Montezuma Castle was taken between 1991 and 1994 by researchers from Northern Arizona University and the United States Geological Survey. According to the United States Geological Survey, about 784 species were recorded at Montezuma Castle National Monument, including plants, fish, amphibians, reptiles, birds, and mammals. Only 11% of the species were non-native. Common species include bats, snakes, turtles, lizards, frogs, foxes, owls and mice.

Federal protection
The monument itself encloses 860 acres near the geographic center of Arizona and the intersection of the Colorado Plateau and Basin and Range physiographic provinces.

The dwellings and the surrounding area were declared a U.S. National Monument on December 8, 1906 as a result of the American Antiquities Act, signed  earlier that year. It is one of the four original sites designated National Monuments by President Theodore Roosevelt. Montezuma Castle was added to the National Register of Historic Places on October 15, 1966.

It is an easy monument to visit, just a short distance off Interstate 17, at exit 289. There is a  paved trail starting at the visitor center that follows the base of the cliff containing the ruins. Access to the interior of the ruins has not been allowed since 1951 due to concerns about visitor safety and damage to the dwelling. About 400,000 tourists visit the site each year. The park is open from 8am to 5pm every day of the year, except for Christmas Day.

The visitor center includes a museum about the Sinagua culture and the tools they used to build the dwellings. The museum houses many artifacts, such as stone tools, metates used for grinding corn, bone needles, and ornaments of shell and gemstone, which prove that the Sinagua were fine artisans as well as prolific traders. There is also a Park Store operated by Western National Parks Association.

Montezuma Well

Montezuma Well, a natural limestone sinkhole, measuring approximately 100 by 120 yards, also containing Sinagua dwellings, was purchased by the federal government in 1947 and is considered a detached unit of Montezuma Castle National Monument. It is located about 5 miles north of the Castle near the town of Rimrock, Arizona, accessible from exits 293 and 298 off Interstate 17.

Climate
Montezuma Castle National Monument has a cold semi-arid climate (Köppen: BSk) with cool winters and very hot summers.

In popular culture

Montezuma Castle plays a key role in the climax of the Western Flaming Feather (1952), which was shot on location at the site.

Architecture based on

The Rocky Slope Residence was designed by well-known Phoenix Valley architect Eddie M. Jones and the residence had strong architectural similarities to the Montezuma Castle Monument. The design and the residence were featured by many magazines including the "Architect Magazine" in 2013. The design was completed and approved by the City of Phoenix in 2007 and construction was completed by 2009. As seen in the photos, the house design has a strong resemblance to the curved walls of Montezuma Castle as well as the layered structure.

See also
List of national monuments of the United States
List of the oldest buildings in Arizona

References
Notes

Bibliography

External links

 
 
 
 
 
 

National Park Service National Monuments in Arizona
Archaeological sites in Arizona
Archaeological museums in Arizona
Cliff dwellings
Museums in Yavapai County, Arizona
Native American museums in Arizona
Archaeological sites on the National Register of Historic Places in Arizona
National Register of Historic Places in Yavapai County, Arizona
Ancient Puebloan archaeological sites in Arizona
Protected areas of Yavapai County, Arizona
Former populated places in Yavapai County, Arizona
Historic American Buildings Survey in Arizona
1906 establishments in Arizona Territory
Protected areas established in 1906
Sinagua
Populated places on the National Register of Historic Places in Arizona